Curly Sue is a 1991 American comedy drama film written, produced, and directed by John Hughes, and starring James Belushi, Kelly Lynch and Alisan Porter. It tells the story of a homeless con artist and his young orphan companion who gain shelter with a rich divorce lawyer. This was the final film directed by Hughes. The film received generally negative reviews from critics.

Plot
Bill Dancer and his young companion Curly Sue, an orphaned little girl who Bill took in as a baby, are the archetypal homeless folks with hearts of gold. Their scams are aimed not at turning a profit, but at getting enough to eat. One night, while sleeping at a shelter, Sue's tin ring, which was left to her by her late mother, is stolen and pawned by a drifter.

After moving from Detroit to Chicago, the duo succeed in conning a rich divorce lawyer named Grey Ellison into believing she backed her Mercedes into Bill, in hopes of a free meal. When Grey accidentally collides with Bill for real the following night, she insists on putting the two up for the night, even over the objections of her snotty fiancé Walker McCormick. After a confrontation with Bill exposing the truth of the con, Bill admits the truth and tells Grey it's time for him and Sue to be moving on. Thinking Bill has been abusing Sue by using her in his cons and scams, Grey demands that Sue stays with her when Bill leaves, but this only angers Bill, who tells Grey he will not leave Sue. He tells Grey that after all the years he looked after her, if he gave up Sue now, people would make fun of her for being on welfare. He tells Grey he cares about Sue genuinely, and that his cons are his only means to provide for her. Grey lets them stay for as long as they need when she understands the precarious position the homeless pair are in.

One night, Bill tells Grey he is not Sue's father, and how he met Sue's mother one night in Florida. He also tells Grey after Sue's mother died, Bill raised her himself, growing to love her like his own. Thus, when they lost their home and money, Bill could not find it in his heart to put Sue in an orphanage, so he took her with him. However, when it becomes apparent that Sue is completely unable to read or write (despite spelling a difficult word earlier), Grey begins to push even harder for Bill to leave Sue with her.

Eventually, Bill realizes this is where Sue belongsin a home, cared for by someone who can give her the advantages his homeless, nomadic existence lacks. Walker eventually, out of spite, turns them in and Sue gets put into welfare, while Bill is arrested because of never actually having had custody of the child. While in jail, Bill encounters the drifter who stole Sue's ring, and forces him to reveal what he did with it. After this happens, Grey arrives to get Bill out of jail, and has also gotten Sue out of welfare.

After learning that the drifter took the ring to a pawn shop and sold it, Bill, now knowing where it is, goes there and buys it back after his release. Sue and Grey return to their apartment, and discover the ring, which Sue takes as a sign that Bill has decided the time has come for the two to part ways, leaving her with Grey. However, the ring is accompanied by a note saying he is in the living room. Sue is happy to find Bill, realizing the ring was actually a sign that he is going to give up his old lifestyle so he can stay with Sue and pursue a romance with Grey.

The pair legally adopt Sue, and Grey and Bill are subsequently married. The film ends with Grey and Bill dropping Sue off on her first day of school.

Cast
 James Belushi as Bill Dancer
 Kelly Lynch as Grey Ellison
 Alisan Porter as Curly Sue
 John Getz as Walker McCormick
 Fred Thompson as Bernard Oxbar
 Branscombe Richmond as Albert
 Gail Boggs as Ansie Hall
 Viveka Davis as Trina
 Barbara Tarbuck as Mrs. Arnold
 Cameron Thor as Maitre d'
 Edie McClurg as Secretary
 Steve Carell as Tesio (credited as Steven Carell; in his film acting debut)
 Burke Byrnes as Dr. Maxwell
 John Ashton as Mr. Frank Arnold (uncredited)

Release
The film debuted at No. 2 at the box office with a gross of $4,974,958 on 1,634 screens. The following weekend it increased its weekend gross by seven percent to $5.3million from the same number of screens and remained in second place. In its third weekend it continued on the same number of screens and managed to move into first place, taking more in its third week than in its first or second. Its final gross in the U.S. and Canada was $33,691,313.

Home media
Warner Home Video released it on DVD on June 1, 2004, with commentary and an introduction by Porter on special features.

Reception
The film received mostly negative reviews from critics. On Rotten Tomatoes, Curly Sue holds a 13% rating based on 15 reviews, with an average rating of 3.7/10. Audiences surveyed by CinemaScore gave the film a grade of "B+" on scale of A+ to F.

Leonard Maltin gave it one and a half stars out of four in his Movie Guide, and called it "A John Hughes formula movie where the formula doesn't work". 

Halliwell's Film Guide calls it "Gruesomely sentimental and manipulative". 

Nigel Andrews of the Financial Times declared, "John Hughes here graduates from the most successful comedy in film history to scripting and directing a large piece of non-biodegradable tosh." 

Roger Ebert gave the film three out of four stars, complimenting "the quiet humor and the warmth of the actors." He said the movie is "not great and it's not deep, but it sure does have a heart."

References

External links

1990s romantic comedy-drama films
1991 films
American romantic comedy-drama films
Films about con artists
Films about homelessness
Films directed by John Hughes (filmmaker)
Films produced by John Hughes (filmmaker)
Films set in Chicago
Films set in a movie theatre
Films shot in Chicago
Films scored by Georges Delerue
Films with screenplays by John Hughes (filmmaker)
Warner Bros. films
1990s English-language films
1990s American films